Alfie Dillon Beestin (born 1 October 1997) is an English professional footballer who plays as an attacking midfielder for Scunthorpe United.

He was born in Leeds and trained with the York College/i2i Football Development Centre, also playing for the Tadcaster Albion development team.

Early life 
Born in Leeds, Beestin studied at The Co-operative Academy of Leeds, before moving on to York College, achieving a Level 2 Certificate in Sport and a Level 1 Coaching Award.

He started his career at the Tadcaster Albion development team, scoring four goals in three games. During a trial at Doncaster Rovers he impressed manager Darren Ferguson.

Career

Beestin signed for Doncaster Rovers on 2 August 2016. Following his signing, manager Darren Ferguson said "ability-wise he's got a hell of a lot".

Beestin came on as a substitute against Mansfield Town in the EFL Trophy, scoring on his debut in a 2–0 victory. In a 5–1 victory against Morecambe Beestin made his League debut as a substitute In his fourth start for the club, he scored his first League goal, the opener in the 1–1 draw against Plymouth on 13 January 2018.

He was released by Doncaster at the end of the 2018–19 season.

Beestin joined Scunthorpe United in January 2020 having previously been playing with Tadcaster Albion.

Career statistics

References

External links

1997 births
Living people
Footballers from Leeds
English footballers
Association football midfielders
English Football League players
National League (English football) players
Northern Premier League players
Tadcaster Albion A.F.C. players
Chesterfield F.C. players
Doncaster Rovers F.C. players
Scunthorpe United F.C. players